The 1986 Torneo Descentralizado, the top category of Peruvian football (soccer), was played by 30 teams. The season started in 1986 but ended in early 1987. The national champion was first-time winner San Agustín.

Format
The national championship was divided into two tournaments; the Torneo Regional and Torneo Descentralizado. The winners of each tournament faced off in the season final and received the berths for the 1987 Copa Libertadores. The Torneo Regional divided the teams into four groups; Metropolitan, North, Central, and South. Each group had its teams advance to the Liguilla Regional, the Torneo Descentralizado and the División Intermedia. The Liguilla Regional determined the Regional champion. The Descentralizado divided the teams in three groups and the top two in each group advanced to the Descentralizado Liguilla which decided the Descentralizado champion. The División Intermedia was a promotion/relegation tournament between first and second division teams. Teams received two points for a win and one point for a draw. No points were awarded for a loss.

Teams

Torneo Regional

Metropolitan

North

Central

South

Qualification playoffs
The winners advanced to the Torneo Descentralizado.

Liguilla Regional
The four group winners and the second placed team in the Metropolitan group qualified directly to the quarter-finals. The remaining qualified teams started in the preliminary round to determine the 3 remaining quarter-finalists. Numbers in parentheses indicate a penalty shootout result. The Regional winner qualified to the 1987 Copa Libertadores and advanced to the Final of the season.

Torneo Descentralizado
The top two of each group advanced to the Liguilla.

Group A

Group B

Group C

Liguilla
The winner of the Liguilla qualified to the 1987 Copa Libertadores and advanced to the Final of the season.

Final

Topscorer
16 goals
  Juvenal Briceño (Melgar)

References

External links
RSSSF Peru 1986

1986
Peru
Primera Division Peruana